The Shukhov cracking process is a thermal cracking process invented by Vladimir Shukhov and Sergei Gavrilov.  Shukhov designed and built the first thermal cracking device for the petrochemical industry. His patent (Shukhov cracking process – patent of Russian empire No. 12926 from November 27, 1891) on cracking was used to invalidate Standard Oil's patents (Burton process – Patent of United States  No. 1,049,667 on January 7, 1913) on oil refineries. In 1937 the Shukhov cracking process  was superseded by catalytic cracking. It is still in use today to produce diesel.

See also
 Cracking (chemistry)
 Timeline of historic inventions
 Burton process

References
 Information on cracking in oil refining
 Biography of Vladimir Shukhov
 "Vladimir G. Suchov 1853-1939. Die Kunst der sparsamen Konstruktion.",  Rainer Graefe und andere, 192 S., Deutsche Verlags-Anstalt, Stuttgart, 1990, .

Chemical processes
Oil refining
Vladimir Shukhov
History of the petroleum industry
Russian inventions